Terje Moe (4 November 1933 – 24 July 2009) was a Norwegian architect.

He was born in Oslo. He graduated from the Norwegian Institute of Technology in 1959, and worked as a teacher there from 1959 to 1966. He then worked at the Oslo School of Architecture and Design from 1966 to 1970, ran his own architect's office from 1970 to 1976 before returning to the School of Architecture and Design as an associate professor in 1976. In 1987 he became a professor at the Norwegian Institute of Technology, and he left the School of Architecture and Design. He died in July 2009.

References

1930 births
2009 deaths
Norwegian Institute of Technology alumni
Academic staff of the Norwegian Institute of Technology
Academic staff of the Oslo School of Architecture and Design
Artists from Oslo